ROKPA International is an international humanitarian organisation founded in 1980 by Akong Tulku Rinpoche, Lea Wyler and Dr. V. Wyler which operates principally in Nepal, Zimbabwe and South Africa. Its aim is to improve the quality of life of people in need irrespective of their religion, nationality or cultural background.

ROKPA International has its headquarters in Zurich, Switzerland with national headquarters and branches in 18 countries.

In 2018, Rokpa opened the Akong Rinpoche Memorial Center (ARMC) in Kathmandu. Here, in cooperation with EHLsmile of the Lausanne Hotel Management School, young people are trained in hotel management and women in the extended women's workshop as seamstresses, knitters or weavers. The operation of the ARMC is partly financed by income from the Rokpa Guest House and the Rokpa Women's Workshop.

References

External links

 

Development charities based in Switzerland
Foreign charities operating in Nepal
Foreign charities operating in Tibet